Campylonotus is a genus of crustaceans belonging to the monotypic family Campylonotidae.

The species of this genus are found in southernmost Southern Hemisphere.

Species:

Campylonotus arntzianus 
Campylonotus capensis 
Campylonotus rathbunae 
Campylonotus semistriatus 
Campylonotus vagans

References

Decapod genera